With Israel for Peace (MIFF) is a Norwegian pro-Israel organisation. It styles itself as a "non-religious, non-partisan pro-Israel organisation", and has more than 11,000 registered members as of 2017. A main concern of the organisation is what it sees as a negative bias towards Israel in mainstream Norwegian media coverage. The director of the organisation is Conrad Myrland, and the president is Morten Fjell Rasmussen.

History
MIFF was founded in 1978. Since then it has grown substantially from 1,200 members in 2005, to more than 11,000 as of 2017. In January 2009 a peaceful rally by MIFF was attacked amid violent anti-Israel riots in Oslo. By early 2014 MIFF had more than twice as many members as the main pro-Palestine organisation in Norway, the Palestine Committee of Norway.

In July 2014 the organisation accused Mads Gilbert of lying about Israel, and put ads in Norwegian newspapers debunking claims made by Gilbert. The organisation was itself accused of stirring up television viewer storms against NRK reporter Sidsel Wold and TV 2 reporter Fredrik Græsvik. In August 2014 MIFF held a rally with up to 600 people in Oslo, with speakers including members of parliament Hans Fredrik Grøvan and Kristian Norheim. The organisation received a record  in gifts and membership fees during the month of August 2014. Notable members of MIFF includes retired football player Anders Rambekk, member of parliament Erlend Wiborg, and former member of parliament Hallgrim Berg.

In 2015 MIFF became a co-founding member of the European Alliance for Israel, which included delegates from fifteen European countries, of which MIFF was the largest group by membership.

References

External links
 Official website
 Official website (in English)

1978 establishments in Norway
Organizations established in 1978
Israel–Norway relations
Norway friendship associations
Israel friendship associations
Non-governmental organizations involved in the Israeli–Palestinian peace process
Israeli–Palestinian peace process
Jewish Norwegian history
Zionism in Norway